Mildred Edith Freeman (née Nonweiler; 11 May 1908 – 15 December 2003) was a British tennis player who appeared at eight Wimbledon Championships. She reached the third round of the mixed doubles in 1937.

She participated in the singles event of Wimbledon Championships from 1931 to 1935 and her singles record was two wins and five losses.

She married William Frank Freeman on 26 July 1934.

References

British female tennis players
1908 births
2003 deaths
Sportspeople from Tokyo
20th-century British women